Tropical Bank is a commercial bank in Uganda. It is licensed and supervised by the Bank of Uganda, the country's central bank and national banking regulator.

Overview
, Tropical Bank was a small financial services provider in Uganda. The bank's assets at that time were UGX:316 billion (approximately US$84 million).

History
The bank was established in 1973 as the Arab Libyan Bank for Foreign Trade & Development. In 1994, the name was changed to Tropical Africa Bank Limited. In 2006, the bank re-branded to Tropical Bank.

Ownership
99.91 percent of the share capital of Tropical Bank is owned by the Libyan government through the Libyan Foreign Bank. The remaining 0.09 percent is owned by the government of Uganda through the Ministry of Finance & Economic Development.

Governance
Tropical Bank is governed by a six-person board of directors, of whom two are executive directors and four are non-executive. Khalifa Achour Ettalua, one of the non-executive directors, is the Deputy Board Chairman. Abdulaziz M.A. Mansur is the managing director and Joweria Mukalaziis the acting executive director. Three other managers assist him in running the bank.

Branch network
, Tropical Bank had a network of branches in the Central,  Western and Eastern regions of Uganda.

 Kampala Road Branch - 27 Kampala Road, Kampala (Main Branch) and Head Office
 Ntinda Branch - 1 Kimera Road, Ntinda, Kampala
 Jinja Branch - 17 Main Street, Jinja
 Masaka Branch - 2 Birch Avenue, Masaka
 Mukono branch - Mukono, Uganda Mukono
 Kawempe Branch - 3144 Kampala-Gulu Road, Kawempe, Kampala
 Oasis Mall Branch - Yusuf Lule Road, Kampala
 Kakira Branch - Downtown Area, Kakira

See also
List of banks in Uganda
Banking in Uganda

References

External links
 Tropical Bank Website
  Photo of Tropical Bank Headquarters
 Tropical Bank Total Assets In December 2011

Banks of Uganda
Companies based in Kampala
Banks established in 1973
1973 establishments in Uganda